Mary Baldwin may refer to:

 Mary Julia Baldwin (1829–1897), American educator after whom Mary Baldwin University is named
 Mary Briscoe Baldwin (1811–1877), American missionary educator 
 Mary Wilson, Baroness Wilson of Rievaulx (née Baldwin, 1916–2018), English poet and the wife of Harold Wilson
 Mary Baldwin University, a private women's university in the USA